St Luke's Church is an Anglican church located in Douglas, County Cork, Ireland. It is dedicated to Luke the Evangelist. Originally a chapel of ease for the parish of Carrigaline, population growth led to Douglas being made a parish in its own right. It is part of the Douglas Union of Parishes, in the Diocese of Cork, Cloyne, and Ross.

History 

Originally constructed in 1786 as a chapel of ease to Carrigaline, by 1875 Douglas had experienced population growth to the extent that Douglas was made a separate parish. It was consecrated that same year. The chapel was substantially rebuilt that year, to the designs of Cork engineer Osborne Cadwallader Edwards. In 1885, the nave was lengthened and a tower and spire were added, designed by William Henry Hill.

Sir John Arnott and Dr Richard Caulfield are among those interred in St Luke's graveyard.

Architecture 
The building was designed by Osborne Cadwallader Edwards. The church is cruciform. Some of the building's stained glass windows were designed by William Burges.

References

Notes

Sources 

 

Architecture in Ireland
Churches in the Diocese of Cork, Cloyne and Ross
19th-century Church of Ireland church buildings